The 2018–19 Cal State Fullerton Titans men's basketball team represented California State University, Fullerton in the 2018–19 NCAA Division I men's basketball season. The Titans were led by sixth-year head coach Dedrique Taylor and competed at the Titan Gym. CSU Fullerton was a member of the Big West Conference, and participated in their 45th consecutive season in that league. They finished the season 16–18, 10–6 in Big West play to finish in a tie for second place. On March 15, Fullerton defeated UCSB to reach the finals of the Big West tournament, where they played top-seeded UC Irvine in an attempt to reach the NCAA tournament for the second successive year; however, the Titans were handily defeated by the Anteaters, 92–64, in a rematch of the previous year's championship. They were invited to the CollegeInsider.com Tournament where they lost in the first round to Cal State Bakersfield.

Previous season

The Titans finished 20–12 overall, and 10–6 in the conference. During the season, the Titans participated in the Wooden Legacy, which was held in Fullerton, California. The Titans finished in 5th place from defeating Harvard and Sacramento State but losing to Georgia. In the postseason, CSU Fullerton defeated Long Beach State, UC Davis, and UC Irvine to become champions of the 2018 Big West Conference men's basketball tournament in Anaheim, California. In addition, the Titans participated in the 2018 NCAA Division I men's basketball tournament, where they lost to Purdue in Detroit, Michigan in the first round.

Roster

Schedule

|-
!colspan=12 style=""|Exhibition

|-
!colspan=12 style=""|Non–conference regular season

|-
!colspan=12 style=""| Big West regular season

|-
!colspan=12 style=""| Big West tournament

|-
!colspan=12 style=|CollegeInsider.com Postseason tournament
|-

References

Cal State Fullerton
Cal State Fullerton Titans men's basketball seasons
Cal State Fullerton
Cal State Fullerton
Cal State Fullerton